West Lutton is a village in the Ryedale district of North Yorkshire, England. It was historically part of the East Riding of Yorkshire until 1974. The village lies in the Great Wold Valley and the course of the winterbourne stream the Gypsey Race passes through it.

They are recorded in the Domesday Book in 1086 as one location, and were home to at least five families. In common with other villages at the time, the Luttons suffered during William the Conqueror's Harrying of the North, during which many farms and homesteads were laid waste, evidenced by the dramatic drop in their annual contribution to the local landowner: from £14 in 1066 to less than £1 in 1086.

West Lutton forms part of the civil parish of Luttons.

The village church, St Mary's, is designated a Grade II* listed building. The church contains a sculpture by the Derbyshire sculptor James Redfern.

In 1823 West Lutton was in the parish of Weaverthorpe, the Wapentake of Buckrose, and the Liberty of St Peter's in the East Riding of Yorkshire. Population, including East Lutton was 311. West Lutton occupations included six farmers, one of whom was also a grocer and another a wheelwright, two further wheelwrights, a blacksmith, two shoemakers, two tailors, and the landlord of The Board public house.

Gallery

References

External links

Villages in North Yorkshire